The Mesoamerican pine–oak forests is a composite ecoregion of southern Mexico and Central America, designated by the World Wildlife Fund as one of their Global 200 ecoregions, a list of priority ecoregions for conservation.

These forests include montane subtropical forests where pine and oak trees predominate, stretching across several major mountain ranges, including the Trans-Mexican volcanic belt and the Sierra Madre del Sur. Ecoregions include:

 Central American montane forests
 Central American pine–oak forests
 Chimalapas montane forests
 Sierra Madre del Sur pine–oak forests
 Sierra Madre de Oaxaca pine–oak forests
 Trans-Mexican Volcanic Belt pine–oak forests

See also
 Madrean pine–oak woodlands

External links

Mesoamerican pine-oak forests (World Wildlife Fund)

Tropical and subtropical coniferous forests
Ecoregions of Central America
Ecoregions of Mexico
Natural history of Mesoamerica
Ecoregions of El Salvador
Ecoregions of Guatemala
Ecoregions of Honduras
Ecoregions of Nicaragua

Forests of El Salvador
Forests of Mexico
Forests of Nicaragua
Sierra Madre de Chiapas
Trans-Mexican Volcanic Belt

Neotropical ecoregions